U.S. Route 64 is a U.S. highway running from Teec Nos Pos, Arizona east to Nags Head, North Carolina. In the U.S. state of Arkansas, the route runs  from the Oklahoma border in Fort Smith east to the Tennessee border in Memphis. The route passes through several cities and towns, including Fort Smith, Clarksville, Russellville, Conway, Searcy, and West Memphis. US 64 runs parallel to Interstate 40 until Conway, when I-40 takes a more southerly route.

Route description

US 64 crosses Arkansas' western border over the Arkansas River, heading southeast into downtown Ft. Smith.  Upon entry to Arkansas, the highway passes the Fort Smith National Historic Site, Ft. Smith Confederate Monument, Commercial Hotel and the West Garrison Avenue Historic District, all on the National Register of Historic Places. The highway turns northwest near the New Theatre, following the Arkansas and Missouri Railroad and concurring with US 71 Business onto 10th and 11th Streets. Westbound traffic runs on 10th St and eastbound traffic on 11th St past the Fort Smith Masonic Temple. Traffic converges onto Midland Boulevard. US 64 crosses the Arkansas River again near the American Doughboy Monument as it enters Van Buren on Broadway. US 64 passes the Van Buren Post Office before turning east onto Main Street, then northeast again becoming the Alma Highway. US 64 passes a former alignment, now designated as Oak St. After Oak St, US 64 crosses I-540 and continues east to Alma. US 64 closely follows Interstate 40 until Conway, while also closely following the Arkansas River, the Union Pacific Railroad, and the southern edge of the Ozark National Forest.

US 64 continues through mountainous Franklin County, intersecting the Pig Trail Scenic Byway in Ozark. The route passes the Franklin County Courthouse, and the Ozark Courthouse Square Historic District in Ozark before exiting town continuing east. Route 64 passes a historically significant connector road in Wiederkehr Village before entering Altus and entering Johnson County. US 64 runs through Coal Hill and Hartman before curving northeast and crossing over I-40. The route continues to Clarksville, home of the University of the Ozarks. The route passes the Johnson County Courthouse, historic American Legion Hut, Clarksville Municipal Airport, and Lake Dardanelle before again crossing over I-40 and entering Pope County.

US 64 then parallels Interstate 40, through Russellville and Morrilton.  In Faulkner County, it briefly converges with U.S. Route 65B through Conway heading south before diverging from US 65 Business and Interstate 40 by turning east onto Oak Street.  The highway next approaches Vilonia, following a southerly bypass around the city that opened in October 2011 (replacing its former alignment along Vilonia's Main Street) and rejoining its prior alignment west of the White County line and continuing to El Paso, where it intersects Arkansas Highway 5.  US 64 then travels east to Beebe, where it originally entered town via Center Street and joined with US 67 and US 167.  This former route along Center Street has since been resigned U.S. Route 67B, as all three US highways have been relocated to a concurrent divided highway northwest of Beebe.

US 64 runs along this divided highway past McRae, Garner, and Searcy, where its original route took it north along Main Street, then east along Race Avenue.  This former route is now signed U.S Route 67B.  Later, US 64, 67, and 167 were rerouted southeast of Searcy along Eastline Road, which is now signed Arkansas Highway 367.  Currently, all three highways continue to run northeast along a divided highway running parallel to Eastline Road.

US 64 diverges from US 67 & 167 on the northeast side of Bald Knob, where its former route took it downtown along Highway Avenue, which is now signed Arkansas Highway 367.  US 64 turns east toward the White River and Woodruff County, while the divided US 67 diverges northeast, and US 167 diverges north.

US 64 continues east through Augusta and McCrory, intersecting with US Route 49 at Fair Oaks and bypassing Wynne while in Cross County, and proceeding into Crittenden County through Earle and Crawfordsville, until joining with Interstate 55 at Marion.  Its former route continued east along Military Road, turning south onto the Great River Road, and converging with US Route 63, which has since also been rerouted along Interstate 55.  The former route is signed Arkansas Highway 77.

US 64 continues south to West Memphis, where its former route entered the city from the north via Missouri Street, turning east (diverging from US 63 while converging with US 70 & 79) onto Broadway.  Its current route turns east north of West Memphis as Interstates 55 and 40 briefly converge, before entering Tennessee (and downtown Memphis) along the Interstate 55 bridge.

Each August, a large yard sale similar to the Highway 127 Corridor Sale takes place along  of US 64 in Arkansas, in locations stretching from Fort Smith to Beebe.

History
The Arkansas River Valley has served as an east-west pathway across Arkansas for centuries, with travelers taking advantage of the flat natural topography between the Ozark Mountains and the Ouachita Mountains. When the United States Army began constructing the Memphis to Little Rock Road on January 31, 1824, it followed a historic trail through the region.

National Register of Historic Places
Four original segments of US 64 remain intact and are listed on the National Register of Historic Places. The Menifee segment was listed in 2006, the Scotia segment was listed in 2007, and the Van Buren and Altus segments were listed in 2010. The Horsehead Creek Bridge near Hartman was listed in 2014.

The original segment listings are contained within the Arkansas Highway History and Architecture Multiple Property Submission, which preserves history from Arkansas's highway building era between 1910 and 1965. The Horsehead Creek Bridge was listed within the Historic Bridges of Arkansas MPS. Two other bridges were NRHP-listed until their demolition: the 1920 Galla Creek Bridge near Pottsville was removed in 2000, and the 1930 Augusta Bridge over the White River was removed in 2002.

Van Buren
The Old US 64-Van Buren Segment is a stretch of historic roadway in Van Buren. Now designated Oak Lane, this stretch of concrete road was built in 1928 by Shultz Construction Co. as part of the original alignment of US 64, whose current alignment (built in 1968) travels to the south. It is made out of a tan-colored aggregate mixed with concrete. This segment was part of the first concrete-paved road in Crawford County.

Altus
The Johnson County Line-Ozark-Crawford County Line Road, Altus Segment is a historic roadbed in Altus. It consists of a  section of stone-paved roadbed, located on the north side of US 64 between Robin Way and County Road 515. Built sometime between c. 1918 and 1931, it is the only known example of stone pavement in rural Arkansas. US 64 was redirected onto a new terrain roadway in 1931, leaving this segment as a nameless connector road.

Horseshead Creek Bridge
The US 64 Horsehead Creek Bridge is a historic bridge, carrying US 64 across Horsehead Creek east of Hartman. The trusses are mounted on concrete piers, with the approaches on concrete piers and abutments. The bridge was built in 1933–1934 by Fred Luttjohann, and served as a major crossing point and transportation route until the construction of Interstate 40 (I-40) to the north.

Scotia
The Old US 64, Scotia Segment is a section of historic roadway in the unincorporated community of Scotia. It extends eastward from Country Lane, south of the current alignment of US 64. It is believed to be the longest-surviving element of the c. 1920 alignment of US 64 in Arkansas, and was built on an alignment dating to the 1830s. It is believed this road formed part of the Trail of Tears.

Menifee
Old U.S. Route 64 is a historic former alignment of US 64 in Menifee. Now a portion of Canal Road, it consists of a  section of concrete pavement, extending southward from the current alignment of US 64 near the center of Menifee. Built in 1931 by the Zeigler Construction Company, it is the longest intact portion of the highway's original alignment in Conway County. It was bypassed by the present alignment in 1961.

Historic segment gallery

Major intersections

See also
List of bridges on the National Register of Historic Places in Arkansas
National Register of Historic Places listings in Crawford County, Arkansas
National Register of Historic Places listings in Conway County, Arkansas
National Register of Historic Places listings in Franklin County, Arkansas
National Register of Historic Places listings in Johnson County, Arkansas
National Register of Historic Places listings in Pope County, Arkansas
Special routes of U.S. Route 64, six special routes of US 64 exist in Arkansas

References

 Arkansas
64
National Register of Historic Places in Crawford County, Arkansas
National Register of Historic Places in Conway County, Arkansas
National Register of Historic Places in Franklin County, Arkansas
National Register of Historic Places in Johnson County, Arkansas
National Register of Historic Places in Pope County, Arkansas
Roads on the National Register of Historic Places in Arkansas
Transportation in Sebastian County, Arkansas
Transportation in Crawford County, Arkansas
Transportation in Franklin County, Arkansas
Transportation in Johnson County, Arkansas
Transportation in Pope County, Arkansas
Transportation in Conway County, Arkansas
Transportation in Faulkner County, Arkansas
Transportation in White County, Arkansas
Transportation in Woodruff County, Arkansas
Transportation in Cross County, Arkansas
Transportation in Crittenden County, Arkansas